Prudnik railway station is a station in Prudnik, Opole Voivodeship, Poland.

The station was opened in 1876 as a part of Upper Silesian Railway.

Connections 
 137 Katowice - Legnica
 306 Gogolin - Prudnik

References

External links 
 
 Przewozy Regionalne website 

railway station
Railway stations in Opole Voivodeship
Railway stations in Poland opened in 1876